University of Itaúna (abbreviated UI) is a private university from Itaúna, Minas Gerais, Brazil. It also has campuses at Almenara and Lagoa da Prata.

References

1965 establishments in Brazil
Educational institutions established in 1965
Universities and colleges in Minas Gerais
Private universities and colleges in Brazil